Amolops panhai, commonly known as the peninsular torrentfrog, is a species of true frog that can be found in western and peninsular Thailand and in eastern Myanmar. It is associated with streams and waterfalls in moist lowland forests.

Its common name in Thai are Marbled Tenasserim Frog (กบลายหินตะนาวศรี) and Panha's Marbled Frog (กบลายหินปัญหา).

The specific name honours Thai herpetologist, invertebrate biologist and malacologist Prof. Dr. Somsak Panha, professor of Department of Biology, Faculty of Science, Chulalongkorn University, who is key personnel in herpetology and malacology of Thailand.

References

panhai
Amphibians described in 2006
Amphibians of Myanmar
Amphibians of Thailand